Superlitio is a Latin rock band from Cali, Colombia formed in 1997. Its members are Pedro Rovetto (bass), Pipe Bravo (Lead Voice, keyboards and guitar), Alejandro Lozano (guitar), Armando Gonzalez (drums) and Dino Leandro (Machines and Ukulele).

History

With four independent records including the multi-awarded Tripping Tropicana (produced by Tweety Gonzalez, the same behind Fito Páez and Gustavo Cerati) and their latest album Calidosound (producer by the multi Grammy winner Rafa Sardina), the band has participated and headlined a wide variety of international festivals, reaching all corners of Colombia, Latin America, Latin US and Central America.

Throughout their career Superlitio has performed with artist such as Juanes, Café Tacuba, Julieta Venegas, Control Machete, Babasónicos, Molotov, Aterciopelados and Manu Chao.

Apart from being nominated for the Latin Grammy Award (2004) as "Best New Artist", Superlitio has also achieved important awards and recognitions such as the LBE Music Awards (winner for "Best New Latin Alternative Artist"), SHOCK Awards (winner for "Best Recording of the Year", "Band of the Year", "Best Video" and "Best Alternative Band"), and Univision's "Premios Lo Nuestro" nomination for "Best Rock Album".

Superlitio has often been recognized by the local and international media as a band capable of mixing a wide range of rhythms where languages barriers are overpassed, switching from Spanish to French and English, while combining rock, hip-hop, drum n bass, jazz, funk, electronic, reggae and Latin rhythms. 

Due to their musical richness Superlitio's catalogue has been highly demanded by important Colombian broadcasters who have used Superlitio's music on  highly rated Colombian TV series and reality shows such as Francisco el Matematico (a TV series sold to more than 20 countries) and the Colombian version of the X Factor. In fact, in the summer of 2008, Superlitio reached #1 in several Colombian radio stations with the main theme and soundtrack of Dog Eat Dog, a critically acclaimed Colombian film.

In September 2008 after several weeks of pre-production between Los Angeles - US and Cali - Colombia, Superlitio entered the studio to record their fourth album. During the sessions, Superlitio recorded 10 new songs as well as more than 10 hours of video and plenty of digital images of the entire process. At the same time and in partnership with Casa Editorial El Tiempo (the most important media outlet in Colombia) Superlitio created six "webisodes" which were uploaded on to "vive.in" the most popular music & entertainment website in Colombia. In less than 6 weeks the website reached more than 25,000 page-views and reported over 16,000 unique users, at the time very significant figures for the digital industry in Colombia.

The band independently released its fourth album Calidosound in July 2009, having teamed up with award-winning Spanish producer Rafa Sardina who previously had worked with artists such as Stevie Wonder and Macy Gray. The year saw them headline Rock al Parque, the largest open rock festival in Latin America, while also winning the Recording of the Year award at the SHOCK Awards, the most prestigious music awards in Colombia.

Superlitio have also won plaudits for their innovative use of digital, notching up more than 40,000 downloads of their latest album preview with a Colombian newspaper, and more than 150,000 streams on the MSN portal during the launch week.

In March 2010, right after their second appearance at SXSW Festival and a short US tour with shows in NYC, Washington, and Miami, CALIDOSOUND was digitally released on a global scale through The Orchard. "Perro Come Perro" was chosen as the single of the week in iTunes Latino US and Mexico achieving over 50.000 downloads.

As of July 2010 the band was extensively touring Colombia promoting their latest single "Te Lastime", which have already reached the number one spot in several radio stations around the country supported by a viral stop-motion video.

Time line

 Between 1997 and 1999, Superlitio released two independent albums Marciana and El Sonido Mostaza receiving great reviews from media and specialized press in Colombia.
 In 2000 the band's music starts to appear in several playlist from independent and commercial radio stations in the United States.
 In the summer of 2001 the band embarks on their first US tour, playing to large diverse crowds in cities such as New York and Los Angeles.
 In 2004, after releasing the US debut Tripping Tropicana (CMG / Sony BMG) Superlitio received a Latin Grammy nomination in the Best New Artist category. The album was produced by the Argentine Tweety González (Soda Stereo, Gustavo Cerati, Illya Kuryaki, Fito Páez).
 Rolling Stone LA's catalogs the band as one of the "Bands to Watch for 2005″. The band also appears in the cover of the 2004 People of the Year December issue along with Eminem, Michael Moore, and Julieta Venegas.
 Other awards and nominations for Tripping Tropicana include: La Banda Elastica award for "Best New Alternative Artist" and three Shock awards (Colombia) for "Best National Group", "Best Video of the Year" and "Best Alternative Group". Superlitio was also nominated for "Best Rock Album of The Year" for Univision's Premios lo Nuestro in 2005.
 Tripping Tropicana's first single, "Que vo’ Hacer" hit number one on several radio stations, while the video reached high rotation on major music television networks including MTVLA, MTV3S and VHUno.
 The video for "Lo Fi", directed by Colombian director Andres Mendez rotated on MTVLA, the Virgin Megastore chain in France, Much Music and other channels in Colombia and the US.
 The first track on Tripping Tropicana, entitled "Babylon" was released on the influential BMG US Latin compilation Latin Rock Explosion Volumen 2, along with tracks from Alejandra Guzmán, Gustavo Cerati, Jumbo, Julieta Venegas, Aterciopelados and more.
 Superlitio was featured in several shows from the top television and radio networks in the US, including Univision, Telemundo, Mun2 and Super Estrella. The band was also interviewed and did a live worldwide performance on CNN en Espanol
 Other press coverage has included Rolling Stone, LOFT, Newsday, Billboard, Batanga, Al Borde (cover), La Opinión, LA Daily News, Miami Herald and many more.
 In 2005 the band performed at SXSW in 2005 alongside touring the US in March/April.
 Tripping Tropicana is released in South America and Europe in 2005.
 Alongside the Colombian superstar Juanes, Superlitio performs in their hometown in front of 40,000 people in 2006.
 The band closed 2006 with a massive concert in Cali for more than 10,000 people. The show was broadcast live to an estimate of over one million viewers.
 In October 2007, Superlitio performed in front of 80,000 people as headliner at the 10th anniversary of South America's largest rock festival "Rock al Parque"
 In 2008 Superlitio produced and recorded the lead track for Carlos Moreno's Perro Come Perro; one of the most awaited and commented Colombian films in the past years. The song has reached number one in several Colombian radio stations.

Awards & Recognitions 

 Latin Grammy Award Nomination (2004) "Best New Artist"
 LBE Music Awards (2004) Winner for "Best New Latin Alternative Artist"
 SHOCK Awards (2005) Winner "Band of the Year" - Winner "Best Video" - Winner "Best Alternative Band"
 Univision "Premio Lo Nuestro" Award Nomination  (2005) "Best Rock Album"
 Much Músic Award Nomination  (2005) Best Fusion Video
 Rolling Stone magazine (2004)Top 50 Records of the year
 Rolling Stone magazine (2005) Band of the Year
 SHOCK magazine (2005) 10 of Most Important band in Colombia Rock History
 Rock al Parque headliners (2003 - 2005–2007 - 2003 - 2005–2007 - 2009) Colombia (40,000 people)
 Recognition from the Mayor of Cali  (2005)
Artistic Ambassadors and international representatives for the city of Cali.
 Recognition from the governor of Valle del Cauca (2007)
Honorable mention as outstanding performer in the arts and culture of the state.
 Record of the year Calidosound - SHOCK Awards (2009)
 Record of the year Calidosound, Best Fusion Band, Guitar Player of the year, Best International Band - Subterranica Awards (2010)

Members

Pedro Rovetto  (Bass)
Andres Bravo  (Lead Voice, Keyboards and Guitar)
Alejandro Lozano (Guitar)
Dino Leandro (Machines and Ukulele)
Armando Gonzalez (Drums)

Discography

Marciana (1997),
El Sonido Mostaza (1999),
Tripping Tropicana (2005),
Calidosound (2009),
Sesiones 10.10 (2010),
Sultana: Manual Psicodélico del Ritmo. Vol1. (2011),
Nocturna. (2014),

External links
Official Band Site
Facebook
Official Myspace
Official Youtube channel
Official Twitter

Colombian rock music groups